Naßweiler (Nassweiler) is an Ortsteil of the German municipality of Großrosseln in the Saarland, directly on the German-French border.

Geography
Naßweiler is located south-east of the Warndt forest. On the French side, Merlebach, Rosbruck and Cocheren abut on Naßweiler.

History
Naßweiler was founded in the year 1608. After 1974 Naßweiler ceased to be a separate municipality, but a part of Großrosseln. There is an existing partnership with Rosbruck since 1992, which is also marked with a monument.

Gallery

Infrastructure
The following institutions are found in Naßweiler:
 Supermarket
 Hairdresser
 Snack shop
 Industrial zone "Am Hirschelheck"
 Party catering
 Farm shop with its own cheesery (Birkenhof)
 Pferde-Ziegenalm
 VHS centre
 Daycare centre for old people
 Since 1960 - Carnival association "Hinne-Hott"
 Moto-cross
 Naßweiler-Südwarndt Canine association
 Sports clubs: SV Naßweiler / TV Naßweiler

Politics
Hans-Werner Franzen of the Social Democratic Party of Germany has been the municipal administrator since 1984.

References

Former municipalities in Saarland
Villages in Saarland